Ian (iRoK) Scott (born 1982) is an American record producer and songwriter. In 2006, Scott joined Mark Jackson to produce and license songs and underscore for hit MTV shows such as The Hills, Laguna Beach, The City, Real World/Road Rules Challenge and many others. Later in 2006 Ian along with his partner Mark produced and co-wrote the hit single Yeah performed by famed Korean Artist Park Jung-ah. The song hit the top of Korean charts and launched Ian's career. The partnership between Jackson and Scott later formed the music production team MJ&iRoK.

Biography
Together MJ&iRoK have produced tracks for artists and groups such as Bishop Briggs, Forever The Sickest Kids, Brandyn H*Wood Bordeaux, Josh Kelley, Pete Yorn, Ice Cube, Snoop Dogg, Park Jung-ah, Girls Aloud, Brenda Song, Alyson Stoner, Colette Carr, Cody Wise and Brinn Nicole, among others.

Publishing company 
In 2010, Scott inked an exclusive publishing deal with Rondor Music Publishing, a division UMPG.

Discography

Songwriting credits

References

1982 births
Living people
American record producers